Pseudostomatella baconi is a species of small sea snail, a marine gastropod mollusk in the family Trochidae, the top snails.

Description
The subturbinate shell has an oval-orbicular shape. The spire is produced, the apex acute. The whorls are concave above.  The color is dull white, variegated with reddish brown. The shell is transversely spirally sulcate, the interstices longitudinally striated. The aperture is sulcate within. The white, inner lip is a little thickened, reflexed, and concentrically striate.

Distribution
This marine species is endemic to Australia and occurs off Western Australia.

References

 Adams, H. & Adams, A. 1854. The genera of Recent Mollusca arranged according to their organization. London : John Van Voorst Vol. 1 pp. 257–484
 Adams, A. 1854. Monograph of Stomatellinae. A sub-family of Trochidae. 827–846, pls 173–175 in Sowerby, G.B. (ed). Thesaurus Conchyliorum. London : Sowerby Vol.
 Hedley, C. 1916. A preliminary index of the Mollusca of Western Australia. Journal and Proceedings of the Royal Society of Western Australia 1: 152–226

baconi
Gastropods of Australia
Gastropods described in 1854